Neophryxe is a genus of flies in the family Tachinidae.

Species
 Neophryxe exserticercus Liang & Chao, 1992
 Neophryxe psychidis Townsend, 1916

References

Tachinidae